The bacterial sroD RNA  gene is a non-coding RNA of 90 nucleotides in length. sroD is found in several Enterobacterial species but its function is unknown.

SroE and SroH were identified in the same bioinformatics search.

References

External links 
 

Non-coding RNA